Lambussie is a small town and is the capital of Lambussie Karni district, a district in the Upper West Region of north Ghana.

References

Populated places in the Upper West Region